Underworld is the fifth and final studio album by Australian band Divinyls, released on November 11 1996 by BMG Records. It was the band's first studio album release in five years and their final release with original lead singer Chrissy Amphlett. The lead single "I'm Jealous" had been successful when released in 1995, however this did not have an effect on the album as Underworld was supposed to be released in the 3rd quarter of 1995, but the album was delayed repeatedly due to production problems. Underworld debuted and peaked at number forty-seven on the ARIA Albums Chart and was their last charting album.

Track listing

Personnel
 Christina Amphlett – lead vocals; backing vocals (tracks 1, 2, 5, 7, 11–13)
 Mark McEntee – guitars, backing vocals
 Charley Drayton – drums (tracks 1–5, 7, 8, 11–14), percussion (tracks 1–3, 5, 7, 11, 12), backing vocals (tracks 1, 2, 5, 7, 8, 11, 13), guitar (1, 4, 7, 8, 11, 13), bass (1, 7, 8)
 Keith Forsey – programming (tracks 2, 12)
 Arthur Barrow – bass (track 2)
 Jerome Smith – bass (tracks 3–5, 7, 8, 11–14)
 Jim Hoke – recorder (track 3)
 Charlie Owen – guitar (track 5, 7, 11, 13)
 Marty Irwin – strings (track 9)

Charts

References

1996 albums
Divinyls albums
Albums produced by Peter Collins (record producer)
RCA Records albums